Bobby Duhon is a retired professional American football player who played running back for four seasons for the New York Giants. Duhon played college football as a left-handed quarterback, and college baseball at Tulane University. Initially, seeing no opportunity for him to compete with star signing Fran Tarkenton, the Giants wanted to convert the mobile Duhon to a safety, but ultimately decided to convert him to running back.

References

1946 births
Living people
American football running backs
American football quarterbacks
New York Giants players
Tulane Green Wave football players
Tulane Green Wave baseball players